Minshull Vernon is a civil parish in Cheshire East, England. It contains 17 buildings that are recorded in the National Heritage List for England as designated listed buildings, all of which are at Grade II. This grade is the lowest of the three gradings given to listed buildings and is applied to "buildings of national importance and special interest". Apart from the village of Minshull Vernon and the settlement of Bradfield Green, the parish is rural. Passing through the parish is the Middlewich Branch of the Shropshire Union Canal, and six of the listed buildings are associated with it, five bridges and an aqueduct. Otherwise the listed buildings comprise farmhouses, houses and associated structures, a war memorial, and two churches.

See also
Listed buildings in Church Minshull

Listed buildings in Stanthorne
Listed buildings in Warmingham
Listed buildings in Wimboldsley

References

Citations

Sources

 

Listed buildings in the Borough of Cheshire East
Lists of listed buildings in Cheshire